De Verraders (Dutch for: The Traitors) is a Dutch television show broadcast by RTL 4 which premiered in 2021. The format of the show is similar to the party game Mafia and the show is presented by Tijl Beckand. The first and second season took place at and around Castle Erenstein in Kerkrade, Netherlands. The third season was filmed in France.

Overview 

In the show, three out of eighteen contestants take on the role of 'Verrader' (Traitor/Betrayer) and all other contestants take on the role of 'Getrouwe' (Faithful). The faithful don't know who the traitors are but viewers of the show are made aware in the first episode. Each night, the traitors gather in secret to decide whom they wish to eliminate from the game; this contestant is said to have been killed and doesn't show up at the next day's morning breakfast. In each episode, the contestants take part in a challenge to earn silver bars which can be won in the end. In some challenges, contestants can also win a shield which protects them from elimination by the traitors that night. After completing a challenge, the contestants return to the castle to take part in the 'Raad' (Council) – a voting round in which all contestants cast a vote on who should be eliminated from the game. In this round, the faithful hope to eliminate a traitor from the game. The eliminated person reveals, before leaving, whether they were either a traitor or a faithful contestant.

In the first season of the show, the contestants played a game to decide the winner of the silver bars in the last episode. The two finalists independently wrote down either the word 'Verraad' (Betrayal) or 'Trouw' (Faithful). If both chose 'Trouw' then they split the prize but if one person chose 'Verraad' then that person won all the silver bars. If both chose 'Verraad' then the runner-up won all the silver bars. In the second season of the show, the team with the most players remaining played this game to decide the winner(s) of the silver bars.

Diederik Jekel, Kees Boot and Holly Mae Brood played the role of traitor in the first season of the show. In the first season, contestants managed to accumulate a total of 22 silver bars over the course of the show. In the final, Samantha Steenwijk and Chatilla van Grinsven ended up splitting the silver bars. After the show, they decided to share their winnings with the runner-up Loiza Lamers. Stefano Keizers, Ortál Vriend and Jamie Westland played the role of traitor in the second season of the show.

Contestants need to complete a psychological test before participating and the show also offers psychological help afterwards.

The show is produced by IDTV and PosVideo in collaboration with RTL Nederland.

Seasons

Season one (2021)

The first episode of season one aired on 13 March 2021.

Season two (2022)
The first episode of season two aired on 1 April 2022.

Season three (2023)
The first episode of season three aired on 3 March 2023.

Videoland

Season one (2021–22)
In December 2021 and January 2022, Art Rooijakkers presented a season of De Verraders which aired on Videoland. This season of the show was filmed at De Havixhorst in De Schiphorst, Meppel, Netherlands.

Halloween (2022) 
In October 2022, a Halloween season of the show aired on Videoland and was presented by season two contestant .

International versions
 Currently airing
 Upcoming seasons
 Status unknown
 Awaiting confirmation
 No longer in production

See also 
 De Mol (TV series)

Notes

References 

2020s Dutch television series
2021 Dutch television series debuts
Dutch game shows
Dutch-language television shows
Television shows filmed in the Netherlands
Television shows filmed in France
RTL 4 original programming
Reality television series franchises